Wilma M. Sherrill was a  Republican member of the North Carolina General Assembly representing the state's one hundred sixteenth House district, including constituents in Buncombe county. She was the main supporter of NC House Bill 769. A businesswoman from Asheville, North Carolina, Sherrill concluded serving her sixth term in the state House in 2006. She currently  serves as a member of the Board of Trustees of the University of North Carolina at Asheville. There, she has a Health and Wellness Center named after her.

References

External links

|-

Members of the North Carolina House of Representatives
Women state legislators in North Carolina
Living people
1939 births
21st-century American politicians
21st-century American women politicians